The following lists events that happened during 2017 in New Zealand.

Population
National
Estimated populations as at 30 June.
 New Zealand total – 4,793,700
 North Island – 3,677,200
 South Island – 1,115,800

Main urban areas
Estimated populations as at 30 June.

Auckland – 1,534,700
Blenheim – 31,300
Christchurch – 396,700
Dunedin – 120,200
Gisborne – 36,600
Hamilton – 235,900
Invercargill – 50,800
Kapiti – 42,300
Napier-Hastings – 133,000
Nelson – 66,700
New Plymouth – 57,500
Palmerston North – 85,300
Rotorua – 58,800
Tauranga – 137,900
Wellington – 412,500
Whanganui – 40,300
Whangārei – 57,700

Incumbents

Regal and vice-regal
Head of State – Elizabeth II
Governor-General – Patsy Reddy

Government
2017 is the third and final full year of the 51st Parliament, which first sat on 21 October 2014 and was dissolved on 17 August 2017. A general election was held on 23 September to elect the 52nd Parliament.

The Fifth National Government, first elected in 2008, ends. The Sixth Labour Government begins.

Speaker of the House – David Carter, then Trevor Mallard from 8 November
Prime Minister – Bill English until 26 October, then Jacinda Ardern
Deputy Prime Minister – Paula Bennett until 26 October, then Winston Peters
Leader of the House – Gerry Brownlee until 2 May, then Simon Bridges until 26 October, then Chris Hipkins
Minister of Finance – Steven Joyce until 26 October, then Grant Robertson
Minister of Foreign Affairs – Murray McCully until 2 May, then Gerry Brownlee until 26 October, then Winston Peters

Other party leaders
Labour – Andrew Little until 1 August, then Jacinda Ardern (Leader of the Opposition until 26 October)
Green  –  James Shaw and, until 9 August, Metiria Turei
New Zealand First – Winston Peters
Māori Party  – Te Ururoa Flavell and Marama Fox
ACT New Zealand – David Seymour
United Future – Peter Dunne until 23 August, then Damian Light until 14 November (party disbanded)

Judiciary
Chief Justice — Sian Elias

Main centre leaders
Mayor of Auckland – Phil Goff
Mayor of Tauranga – Greg Brownless
Mayor of Hamilton – Andrew King
Mayor of Wellington – Justin Lester
Mayor of Christchurch – Lianne Dalziel
Mayor of Dunedin – Dave Cull

Events

February 
 6 February – Sapphire Jubilee of Elizabeth II's accession as Queen of New Zealand
 13 February to 20 April – Wild fires burn on the Port Hills of Christchurch
 22 February – The Canterbury Earthquake National Memorial opens on the sixth anniversary of the 2011 Christchurch earthquake
 25 February – Mount Albert by-election takes place

March 

 7 March – Jacinda Ardern is elected deputy leader of the Labour Party

April 

 6 April – A state of emergency is declared as the town of Edgecumbe is evacuated due to flooding caused by the remnants of Cyclone Debbie
 13–14 April – Cyclone Cook, now an extratropical cyclone, moves across the North Island

May 

 25 May – The 2017 New Zealand budget is presented to Parliament by the Minister of Finance, Steven Joyce

June 

 5 June – The 2017 Queen's Birthday Honours are announced

July 

 19–21 July – Severe flooding hits the east coast of the South Island between Christchurch and Balclutha
 21 July – Mycoplasma bovis disease found in a South Island herd of cows

August 

 1 August – Jacinda Ardern elected leader of the Labour Party after Andrew Little resigns

September 

 23 September – The 2017 general election is held

October 

 26 October – Jacinda Ardern is sworn in as the 40th Prime Minister of New Zealand
 31 October – Trolleybuses are withdrawn from service in Wellington

December 

 4 December – The Healthy Homes Guarantee Act 2017 receives royal assent, having passed its third reading in Parliament on 29 November
 30 December – The 2018 New Year Honours are announced

Sport

Rugby union
2017 British & Irish Lions tour to New Zealand, 3 June – 8 July

Shooting
Ballinger Belt – 
 Jim Bailey (Australia)
 Brian Carter (Te Puke), third, top New Zealander

Births
 9 November – Johnny Get Angry, Thoroughbred racehorse
 20 November – Mo'unga, Thoroughbred racehorse

Deaths

January
 7 January
 Nick Calavrias, businessman (born 1949)
 Sir Bruce Slane, public servant (born 1931)
 8 January – Elspeth Kennedy, sharebroker, community leader (born 1931)
 9 January
 Michael Chamberlain, pastor, exonerated in the death of Azaria Chamberlain (born 1944)
 Brown Turei, Anglican archbishop (born 1924)
 10 January – Heather McPherson, poet (born 1942)
 11 January – Newman Hoar, cricketer (born 1920)
 23 January – Pat Downey, barrister and solicitor, Human Rights Commissioner, legal editor (born 1927)
 24 January – Manu Maniapoto, rugby union player (born 1935)
 26 January – Dame Laurie Salas, women's rights and peace activist (born 1922)

February
 1 February – Bernie Portenski, athlete (born 1949)
 4 February – John Dickson, poet (born 1944)
 8 February – Steve Sumner, association footballer (born 1955)
 12 February – Sione Lauaki, rugby union player (born 1981)
 13 February – Jim Watson, biotechnologist and entrepreneur (born 1943)
 14 February – John Watkinson, soil chemist (born 1932)
 19 February – Halaevalu Mataʻaho ʻAhomeʻe, Tongan royal (born 1926)

March 
 1 March – Tania Dalton, netball player (born 1971)
 3 March – Bramwell Cook, gastroenterologist (born 1936)
 6 March – Dudley Storey, rower (born 1939)
 12 March
 Murray Ball, cartoonist (born 1939)
 Eunice Eichler, midwife, open adoption advocate (born 1932)
 15 March – Phil Garland, folk musician (born 1942)
 23 March – Nigel Hutchinson, film producer and commercial director (born 1941)
 24 March – Roger Bradley, cricketer (born 1962)
 25 March – Eric Watson, rugby union player and coach, cricketer (born 1925)
 27 March
 Shirley Annan, netball player (born 1940)
 Sean Roberts, cricket (born 1968)

April
 3 April
 Tomairangi Paki, Tainui kuia, kapa haka exponent (born 1953)
 Bruce Palmer, lawyer, judge (born 1935)
 Bill Tinnock, rower (born 1930)
 6 April – John Anslow, field hockey player (born 1935)
 7 April – Robin Kay, artist, historian (born 1919)
 8 April – Sir Douglas Myers, businessman (born 1938)
 9 April – John Clarke, satirist (born 1948)
 18 April – Digby Taylor, sailor (born 1941)
 19 April – Jill Amos, politician, activist (born 1927)
 20 April
 David Dougherty, wrongly convicted of rape and abduction (born 1967)
 Sandy McNicol, rugby union player (born 1944)
 27 April
 Danny O'Connor, lawn bowls player
 Alexia Pickering, disabilities rights campaigner (born 1930)

May
 2 May – Hugo Judd, diplomat (born 1939)
 3 May – Doug Rollerson, rugby union and rugby league player (born 1953)
 4 May
 Rosie Scott, author (born 1948)
 Beryl Te Wiata, actor, author, scriptwriter (born 1925)
 6 May – Lyn McLean, lawn bowls player (born )
 13 May – Nicholas Tarling, historian, academic, author (born 1931)
 15 May – Graeme Barrow, author (born 1936)
 17 May – Kevin Stanton, musician (born 1956)
 18 May – George Martin, rugby league player, field athlete (born 1931)
 25 May – Earl Hagaman, hotel operator (born 1925)

June
 11 June – Lois McIvor, artist (born 1930)
 15 June – Dame Ngāneko Minhinnick, Ngāti Te Ata leader (born 1939)
 21 June – Oliver Jessel, businessman (born 1929)
 24 June – Nick Kirk, Anglican cleric (born 1958)
 25 June – David Goldsmith, field hockey player (born 1931)
 26 June
 Sir Duncan McMullin, jurist (born 1927)
 Guy Ngan, artist (born 1926)
 27 June – Jacinta Gray, cyclist (born 1974)
 28 June – Bruce Stewart, author, playwright, marae founder (born 1936)
 29 June – Marrion Roe, Olympic swimmer (born 1935)

July
 3 July – Rolf Prince, chemical engineering academic (born 1928)
 5 July
 Chris de Freitas, climatologist (born 1948)
 John Karlsen, actor (born 1919)
 8 July – Gay Eaton, textile artist (born 1933)
 10 July – Marama Martin, radio and television personality (born 1930)
 12 July – Allan Hunter, rugby union player, teacher, historian (born 1922)
 15 July – Michael Cooper, economist (born 1938)
 16 July – Cliff Whiting, artist, master carver, heritage advocate (born 1936)
 17 July – George Hill, agronomist (born 1938)
 18 July – Ian Mason, cricketer (born 1942)
 23 July
 Wenceslaus Anthony, businessman (born 1957)
 Tom Lister, rugby union player (born 1943)

August
 2 August
 Sir John Graham, rugby union player and administrator, educator (born 1935)
 Paul Renton, rugby union player, farmer (born 1962)
 4 August – Trevor Martin, cricket umpire (born 1925)
 6 August – Tim Homer, radio personality (born 1973)
 10 August
 Dorothy Fletcher, historian (born 1927)
 Sheila Natusch, naturalist, writer, illustrator (born 1926)
 14 August – J. S. Parker, painter (born 1944)
 15 August – Tui Flower, food writer (born 1925)
 19 August – Alan Sayers, athlete, journalist, writer (born 1915)
 20 August – Sir Colin Meads, rugby union player, coach and manager (born 1936)
 22 August – Tom Pritchard, cricketer (born 1917)

September
 5 September – Cedric Hassall, chemist, academic (born 1919)
 9 September – Sir Pat Goodman, businessman, philanthropist (born 1929)
 11 September – Malcolm Templeton, diplomat (born 1924)
 15 September – Alma Evans-Freke, television presenter (born 1931)
 16 September – Andrew Leachman, master mariner (born 1945)
 18 September – Tony Laffey, association footballer (born 1925)
 19 September – John Nicholson, motor racing driver and engine builder (born 1941)
 21 September
 David Beatson, journalist, broadcaster (born 1944)
 Vera Burt, cricketer, hockey player, coach and administrator (born 1927)
 26 September – Wanda Cowley, children's writer (born 1924)
 29 September
 Annette Johnson, alpine skier (born 1928)
 Ian Smith, rugby union player (born 1941)

October
 2 October – Peter Burke, rugby union player, coach and administrator (born 1927)
 3 October – Norma Williams, swimmer, swimming administrator (born 1928)
 12 October – Derek Steward, athlete (born 1928)
 15 October – Francis Pound, art historian, curator and writer (born 1948)
 19 October – Edmund Cotter, mountaineer (born 1927)
 21 October – Dave Leech, hammer thrower (born 1927)
 22 October – Sandy Thomas, military leader (born 1919)
 23 October – Gordon Ogilvie, historian, biographer (born 1934)
 29 October – Roly Green, rugby union player (born 1927)
 30 October – James Beard, architect, town planner, landscape architect (born 1924)
 31 October
 Norman Hardie, mountaineer (born 1924)
 Terry McCashin, rugby union player, brewer (born 1944)

November
 5 November – Geoff Rothwell, World War II bomber pilot (born 1920)
 6 November – Clem Parker, athlete (born 1926)
 7 November – Paddles, cat owned by Jacinda Ardern
 9 November – Tom Coughlan, rugby union player (born 1934)
 15 November
 Dame Sister Pauline Engel, educator (born 1930)
 Moana Manley, swimmer, beauty pageant contestant (born 1935)
 Bert Ormond, association footballer (born 1931)

December
 7 December – Neil Ritchie, cyclist (born 1933)
 12 December – Jane Galletly, television scriptwriter (born 1928)
 13 December
 Simon Dickie, rowing coxswain (born 1951)
 Gerald O'Brien, MP for Island Bay from 1969 to 1978 (born 1924)
 15 December – Michael Hartshorn, organic chemist (born 1936)
 17 December – Castletown, Thoroughbred racehorse (foaled 1986)
 21 December – John Vear, cricketer (born 1938)
 30 December – Dame Cheryll Sotheran, museum executive (born 1945)

Exact date unknown
 Lyn Barnett, singer

References

 
2010s in New Zealand
Years of the 21st century in New Zealand
New Zealand
New Zealand